Patricia Rose Breslin (March 17, 1931 – October 12, 2011) was an American actress and philanthropist. She had a prominent career in television, which included recurring roles as Amanda Miller on The People's Choice (1955–58), and as Laura Harrington Brooks on Peyton Place (1964–65). She also appeared in Go, Man, Go! (1954), and the William Castle horror films Homicidal (1961) and I Saw What You Did (1965).

In 1969, Breslin married NFL mogul Art Modell, and became a well-known philanthropist while living in both Cleveland, Ohio, and Baltimore, Maryland, donating millions of dollars to various educational, health, and art organizations, including the SEED Foundation of Maryland and the Baltimore Museum of Art. She also helped open the Hospice of the Western Reserve at the Cleveland Clinic.

Early life
Patricia Rose Breslin was born in New York City, one of three children born to Edward (a judge) and Marjorie Breslin. Her father was a Catholic of Irish descent and her mother was of Scottish descent. Breslin was raised in the Parkchester neighborhood of the Southeast Bronx. She graduated from the Academy of Mount St. Ursula High School in the Bronx before attending the College of New Rochelle in New Rochelle, New York.

Career
On television, Breslin co-starred in "The Long Walk", the May 30, 1950, episode of Cameo Theatre. In 1954, she guest-starred with Peter Mark Richman in an episode of NBC's legal drama, Justice, as a woman threatened by hoodlums. The same year, she appeared in a supporting role as Sylvia Franklin Saperstein in the sports film Go, Man, Go! (1954), opposite Ruby Dee, Sidney Poitier, and the Harlem Globetrotters.

The following year, Breslin was cast in an episode of the CBS anthology series Appointment with Adventure, a series with neither a host nor a regular star. From 1955 to 1958, Breslin co-starred with Jackie Cooper as his girlfriend and then wife in the NBC sitcom, The People's Choice.

Between 1960 and 1963, Breslin made three guest appearances on CBS's Perry Mason, and was cast as the defendant in all three episodes.  In 1960, she played Karen Lewis in "The Case of the Lavender Lipstick." In 1962, she played Karen Ross in "The Case of the Poison Pen-Pal", and in 1963, as Laura Hewes in "The Case of the Prankish Professor".

In 1960, she played the newlywed wife of William Shatner's character in CBS's The Twilight Zone episode "Nick of Time", and was also in the 1963 Twilight Zone episode "No Time Like the Past", in which she portrayed Abigail Sloan.

In 1960, she guest-starred on the short-lived David McLean Western series, Tate, which aired on NBC. She appeared on Nick Adams' ABC Western, The Rebel and with Jack Lord in his ABC adventure series, Stoney Burke. Thereafter, Breslin played the role of Anne Mitchell, along with co-stars Ralph Bellamy and Paul Fix, in the 1961 episode "The Haven" of CBS's anthology series, The DuPont Show with June Allyson.

She returned to film in 1961, starring in William Castle's horror film Homicidal, and later worked with him again on the thriller I Saw What You Did (1964). In 1964, she was cast in the role of Laura Brooks on the ABC primetime soap opera Peyton Place. She also played the role of Meg Baldwin in the ABC soap opera General Hospital from 1965 to 1969.

Personal life
From 1953 to 1969, Breslin was married to character actor and director David Orrick McDearmon, and they  had two children. Later, Breslin married then Cleveland Browns (later the Baltimore Ravens) NFL team owner, advertising and business executive Art Modell in 1969. Shortly after their marriage, Modell legally adopted Patricia's sons from her first marriage and they took his surname. The family lived in Waite Hill, Ohio, later moving to Owings Mills, Maryland, with a total of six grandchildren between them.

Philanthropy
Breslin became a well-known philanthropist in both Cleveland, Ohio, and Baltimore, Maryland, after relocating to the city in 1995.  Modell and she donated $5 million to the SEED School of Maryland, a public boarding school for disadvantaged junior-high and high-school students from around the state. They also donated $3.5 million to help restore the Lyric Opera House, and Breslin served on the boards of the Baltimore Symphony Orchestra and the Walters Art Museum, and also donated to the Baltimore Museum of Art. 

In Cleveland, she helped start the Hospice of the Western Reserve at the Cleveland Clinic, and supported the Cleveland Clinic Foundation. She was also active in the Make-A-Wish Foundation, the Cleveland Musical Arts Association, the Cleveland Ballet, the Playhouse Square Foundation, and the Cerebral Palsy Association.

Death
Breslin died on October 12, 2011, at the age of 80 after a lengthy hospitalization with pancreatitis. Her funeral was held at the Basilica of the National Shrine of the Assumption of the Blessed Virgin Mary in Baltimore. Her husband Art had been a major contributor to the restoration of the basilica.

Filmography

Film

Television

References

External links

 
 

1931 births
2011 deaths
Actresses from New York City
American film actresses
Philanthropists from New York (state)
American soap opera actresses
American television actresses
20th-century American actresses
Deaths from pancreatitis
College of New Rochelle alumni
People from the Bronx
Actresses from Los Angeles
People from Owings Mills, Maryland
American people of Irish descent
American people of Scottish descent
Catholics from New York (state)
Catholics from Maryland
Parkchester, Bronx
20th-century American philanthropists
21st-century American women